Dave Kneebone is an American television producer. Along with Eric Wareheim and Tim Heidecker, he founded and runs Abso Lutely Productions, which produces a variety of comedic television shows and films.  His role has been described as the business chief and "straight man" at Abso Lutely.  Kneebone has worked as a producer on a variety of television shows, including Comedy Bang! Bang!, Nathan for You, and Tim and Eric Awesome Show, Great Job!.  He is also listed as a producer on the feature film Tim and Eric's Billion Dollar Movie.

References

External links

American television producers
Tim & Eric
Place of birth missing (living people)
Year of birth missing (living people)
Living people